Hamid Reza Noorbakhsh (also spelt Nourbakhsh) is a Persian classical vocalist and musician.

Career 

He studied Iranian classical music under the supervision of Mohammad Reza Shajarian and has performed with several music ensembles, including the Shams Ensemble and the Aref Ensemble, as well as with the Ukraine Philharmonic Orchestra.

Noorbakhsh is currently the director of Iran's House of Music.

References

Year of birth missing (living people)
Living people
People from Qom
Iranian classical singers